Huzurbazar is a surname. Notable people with the surname include:
Aparna V. Huzurbazar, American statistician, daughter of V. S. and sister of Snehalata
Snehalata V. Huzurbazar, American statistician, daughter of V. S. and sister of Aparna
V. S. Huzurbazar (1919–1991), Indian statistician, father of Aparna and Snehalata